Karate competitions at the 2019 Pan American Games in Lima, Peru were held between August 9 and 11, 2019 at the Polideportivo Villa El Salvador, which also hosted the gymnastics competitions.

14 medal events were contested. Ten of these events were in kumite (five per gender). A further four events (two per gender) in kata were contested, after the Panamsports added them to the sports program in March 2017. This marked the first time kata events were held at the Pan American Games since 2003 in Santo Domingo. A total of 132 athletes qualified to compete at the games.

The top three medallists (in order of gold, silver then bronze) not already qualified for the 2020 Summer Olympics according to the Olympic Standings as of April 6, 2020, qualified for the said games.

Medal table

Medallists

Men's events

 Carlos Sinisterra of Colombia originally won the gold medal, but he was disqualified for doping violations.

Women's events

Qualification

A total of 132 karatekas qualified to compete. Each nation entered a maximum of 18 athletes (nine per gender). There were eight athletes qualified in each individual event, along with six teams in the kata team events. This consisted of a maximum of one athlete in the individual events (12), and one group of three in each kata team event (six). The host nation, Peru, automatically qualified the maximum number of athletes (18). The rest of the spots were awarded across four qualification tournaments.

See also
Karate at the 2020 Summer Olympics

References

External links
Results book

 
Events at the 2019 Pan American Games
Pan American Games
2019